VLT may stand for:

Entertainment and media
 Vestmanlands Läns Tidning, a Swedish newspaper in Västerås
 Video lottery terminal, used to gamble on video games

Science and technology
 Very Large Telescope, an astronomical observatory in Chile
 Virtual Link Trunking, a proprietary networking protocol
 Visible light transmission, in car windows or goggles

Other uses
 VLT (Rio de Janeiro), a light rail system in Brazil
 Valletta, Malta (postal code: VLT)
 VLT sandwich, containing vegetarian bacon, lettuce and tomato—analogous with a BLT